Old Woman Mountains Wilderness is a wilderness area in the Old Woman Mountains of the eastern Mojave Desert. It is located south of Essex in San Bernardino County, California.

This  wilderness was established in 1994, and is managed by the Bureau of Land Management.

The 1975 discovery of the Old Woman Meteorite is located in the Old Woman Mountains and is the largest meteorite found in California and the second largest in the United States.

Geography
The mountains take their name from a granite monolith resembling the figure of an old woman, known as the Old Woman Statue (5,000 feet high).

Ecology
The Old Woman Mountains Wilderness falls within a transition zone between the Lower Colorado and Mojave deserts and encompasses many different habitat types. Creosote bush scrub dominates the lower elevations, grading into mixed desert scrub at middle elevations with juniper-pinyon woodland at the higher elevations. The dry washes are characterized by catclaw acacia, cheesebush, desert lavender, little-leaf ratany, and desert almond.

Wildlife is typical for the Mojave Desert; including a permanent population of bighorn sheep, mule deer, bobcat, cougar, coyote, black-tailed jackrabbit, ground squirrels, kangaroo rats, quail, chuckar, roadrunners, rattlesnakes, and several species of lizards. Numerous raptor species are likely to be found in the area; including prairie falcons, red-tailed hawks, golden eagles, Cooper's hawks, American kestrels, as well as several species of owls. The washes and canyons provide good habitat for several species of songbirds, and the bird densities and diversity is further enhanced by the presence of the known 24 springs and seeps.

The bajadas provide excellent desert tortoise habitat;  of the wilderness area have been identified as critical habitat for the threatened desert tortoise.

References

Sources
Part of this article incorporates text from the Bureau of Land Management, which is in the Public domain.
"Old Woman Mountains Wilderness", Bureau of Land Management
"Old Woman Mountains Wilderness", Wilderness.net
Adventuring in the California Desert, Lynne Foster, Sierra Club Books, 1987

Wilderness areas of California
Protected areas of the Mojave Desert
Protected areas of San Bernardino County, California
IUCN Category Ib
Protected areas established in 1994
1994 establishments in California
Bureau of Land Management areas in California